Motorola, Inc. was an American multinational telecommunications company based in Schaumburg, Illinois, United States. After having lost $4.3 billion from 2007 to 2009, the company split into two independent public companies, Motorola Mobility and Motorola Solutions on January 4, 2011. Motorola Solutions is the legal successor to Motorola, Inc., as the reorganization was structured with Motorola Mobility being spun off. Motorola Mobility was acquired by Lenovo in 2014.

Motorola designed and sold wireless network equipment such as cellular transmission base stations and signal amplifiers. Motorola's home and broadcast network products included set-top boxes, digital video recorders, and network equipment used to enable video broadcasting, computer telephony, and high-definition television. Its business and government customers consisted mainly of wireless voice and broadband systems (used to build private networks), and, public safety communications systems like Astro and Dimetra. These businesses (except for set-top boxes and cable modems) are now part of Motorola Solutions. Google sold Motorola Home (the former General Instrument cable businesses) to the Arris Group in December 2012 for US$2.35 billion.

Motorola's wireless telephone handset division was a pioneer in cellular telephones. Also known as the Personal Communication Sector (PCS) prior to 2004, it pioneered the "mobile phone" with DynaTAC, "flip phone" with the MicroTAC as well as the "clam phone" with the StarTAC in the mid-1990s. It had staged a resurgence by the mid-2000s with the RAZR, but lost market share in the second half of that decade. Later it focused on smartphones using Google's open-source Android mobile operating system. The first phone to use the newest version of Google's open source OS, Android 2.0, was released on November 2, 2009, as the Motorola Droid (the GSM version launched a month later, in Europe, as the Motorola Milestone).

The handset division (along with cable set-top boxes and cable modems) was later spun off into the independent Motorola Mobility. On May 22, 2012, Google CEO Larry Page announced that Google had closed on its deal to acquire Motorola Mobility. On January 29, 2014, Google CEO Larry Page announced that pending closure of the deal, Motorola Mobility would be acquired by Chinese technology company Lenovo for US$2.91 billion (subject to certain adjustments). On October 30, 2014, Lenovo finalized its purchase of Motorola Mobility from Google.

History

Motorola started in Chicago, Illinois, as Galvin Manufacturing Corporation (at 847 West Harrison Street) in 1928.

Paul Galvin wanted a brand name for Galvin Manufacturing Corporation's new car radio, and created the name “Motorola” by linking "motor" (for motorcar) with "ola" (from Victrola), which was also a popular ending for many companies at the time, e.g. Moviola, Crayola. The company sold its first Motorola branded radio on June 23, 1930, to H.C. Wall of Fort Wayne, Indiana, for $30. The Motorola brand name became so well known that Galvin Manufacturing Corporation later changed its name to Motorola, Inc.

Galvin Manufacturing Corporation began selling Motorola car-radio receivers to police departments and municipalities in November 1930. The company's first public safety customers (all in the U.S. state of Illinois) included the Village of River Forest, Village of Bellwood Police Department, City of Evanston Police, Illinois State Highway Police, and Cook County (Chicago area) Police.

Many of Motorola's products have been radio-related, starting with a battery eliminator for radios, through the first hand-held walkie-talkie in the world in 1940, defense electronics, cellular infrastructure equipment, and mobile phone manufacturing. In the same year, the company built its research and development program with Dan Noble, a pioneer in FM radio and semiconductor technologies, who joined the company as director of research. The company produced the hand-held AM SCR-536 radio during World War II, which was vital to Allied communication. Motorola ranked 94th among United States corporations in the value of World War II military production contracts.

Motorola went public in 1943,  and became Motorola, Inc. in 1947. At that time Motorola's main business was producing and selling televisions and radios.

Post World War II

The last plant was listed in Quincy, Illinois at 1400 North 30th Street where 1,200 employees made radio assemblies for both home and automobile.

In 1969, Neil Armstrong spoke the famous words "one small step for a man, one giant leap for mankind" from the Moon on a Motorola transceiver.

In 1973, Motorola demonstrated the first hand-held portable telephone.

In 1974, Motorola introduced its first microprocessor, the 8-bit MC6800, used in automotive, computing and video game applications. That same year, Motorola sold its television business to the Japan-based Matsushita – the parent company of Panasonic.

In 1980, Motorola's next generation 32-bit microprocessor, the MC68000, led the wave of technologies that spurred the computing revolution in 1984, powering devices from companies such as Apple, Commodore, Atari, Sun, and Hewlett Packard.

In September 1983, the U.S. Federal Communications Commission (FCC) approved the DynaTAC 8000X telephone, the world's first commercial cellular device. By 1998, cellphones accounted for two thirds of Motorola's gross revenue. 

In 1996, Motorola released the Motorola StarMax, which was a Macintosh clone that was licensed by Apple and it came with System 7. However, with the return of Steve Jobs to Apple in 1997, Apple released Mac OS 8. Because the clone makers' licenses were valid only for Apple's System 7 operating system, Apple's release of Mac OS 8 left the clone manufacturers without the ability to ship a current Mac OS version without negotiation with Apple. A heated telephone conversation between Jobs and Motorola CEO Christopher Galvin resulted in the termination of Motorola's clone contract, the discontinuation of the Motorola StarMax, and the long-favored Apple being demoted to "just another customer" mainly for PowerPC CPUs. Apple (and Jobs) didn't want Motorola to limit the PowerPC CPU supply so as retaliation, Apple and IBM expelled Motorola from the AIM alliance and forced Motorola to stop producing any PowerPC CPUs, leaving IBM to make all future PowerPC CPUs. However, Motorola was later reinstated into the alliance in 1998.

In 1998, Motorola was overtaken by Nokia as the world's biggest seller of mobile phone handsets.

In 1999, Motorola separated a portion of its semiconductor business—the Semiconductor Components Group (SCG)-- and formed ON Semiconductor, whose headquarters are located in Phoenix, Arizona.

After 2000
In June 2000, Motorola and Cisco supplied the world's first commercial GPRS cellular network to BT Cellnet in the United Kingdom. The world's first GPRS cell phone was also developed by Motorola. In August 2000, with recent acquisitions, Motorola reached its peak employment of 150,000 employees worldwide.  Two years later, employment would be at 93,000 due to layoffs and spinoffs.

In June 2005, Motorola overtook the intellectual property of Sendo for $30,000 and paid £362,575 for the plant, machinery and equipment.

In June 2006, Motorola acquired the software platform (AJAR) developed by the British company TTP Communications plc. Later in 2006, the firm announced a music subscription service named iRadio. The technology came after a break in a partnership with Apple Computer (which in 2005 had produced an iTunes compatible cell phone ROKR E1, and most recently, mid-2007, its own iPhone). iRadio has many similarities with existing satellite radio services (such as Sirius and XM Radio) by offering live streams of commercial-free music content. Unlike satellite services, however, iRadio content will be downloaded via a broadband internet connection. As of 2008, iRadio has not been commercially released and no further information is available.

Motorola, post-split

On August 15, 2011, Google announced that it would purchase Motorola Mobility for about $12.5 billion.
On November 17, 2011, Motorola Mobility stockholders “voted overwhelmingly to approve the proposed merger with Google Inc”.

On May 22, 2012, Google announced that the acquisition of Motorola Mobility Holdings, Inc. had closed, with Google acquiring MMI for $40.00 per share in cash. ($12.5 billion)

On October 30, 2014, Google sold off Motorola Mobility to Lenovo. The purchase price was approximately US$2.91 billion (subject to certain adjustments), including US$1.41 billion paid at close: US $660 million in cash and US$750 million in Lenovo ordinary shares (subject to a share cap/floor). The remaining US$1.5 billion was paid in the form of a three-year promissory note.

After the purchase, Google maintained ownership of the vast majority of the Motorola Mobility patent portfolio, including current patent applications and invention disclosures, while Lenovo received a license to the portfolio of patents and other intellectual property. Additionally Lenovo received over 2,000 patent assets, as well as the Motorola Mobility brand and trademark portfolio.

Divisional Products:

Enterprise Mobility Solutions: Headquarters located in Schaumburg, Illinois; comprises communications offered to government and public safety sectors and enterprise mobility business. Motorola develops analog and digital two-way radio, voice and data communications products and systems, mobile computing, advanced data capture, wireless infrastructure and RFID solutions to customers worldwide.
Home & Networks Mobility:  Headquarters located in Arlington Heights, Illinois; produces end-to-end systems that facilitate uninterrupted access to digital entertainment, information and communications services via wired and wireless mediums. Motorola develops digital video system solutions, interactive set-top devices, voice and data modems for digital subscriber line and cable networks, broadband access systems for cable and satellite television operators, and also wireline carriers and wireless service providers.
Mobile Devices: Headquarters located in Chicago, Illinois; designs wireless handsets, but also licenses much of its intellectual properties. This includes cellular and wireless systems and as well as integrated applications and Bluetooth accessories. Some of their latest gadgets are Moto X Gen 3, Moto X Play, Moto 360 smartwatch, etc.

Finances
Motorola's handset division recorded a loss of $1.2 billion in the fourth quarter of 2007, while the company as a whole earned $100 million during that quarter. It lost several key executives to rivals, and the website TrustedReviews called the company's products repetitive and un-innovative. Motorola laid off 3,500 workers in January 2008, followed by a further 4,000 job cuts in June and another 20% cut of its research division a few days later. In July 2008, a large number of executives left Motorola to work on Apple Inc.'s iPhone. The company's handset division was also put on offer for sale.  Also that month, analyst Mark McKechnie from American Technology Research said that Motorola "would be lucky to fetch $500 million" for selling its handset business. Analyst Richard Windsor said that Motorola might have to pay someone to take the division off the company's hands , and that Motorola may even exit the handset market altogether.  Its global market share has been on the decline; from 18.4% of the market in 2007 the company had a share of just 6.0% by Q1 2009, but at last, Motorola scored a profit of $26 million in Q2 and showed an increase of 12% in stocks for the first time after losses in many quarters. During the second quarter of 2010, the company reported a profit of $162 million, which compared very favorably to the $26 million earned for the same period the year before. Its Mobile Devices division reported, for the first time in years, earnings of $87 million.

Spin-offs

Automotive
On January 29, 1988, Motorola sold its Arcade, New York facility and automotive alternators, electromechanical speedometers and tachometers products to Prestolite Electric.

Biometrics
In 2000, Motorola acquired Printrak International Inc. for $160 million. In doing so, Motorola not only acquired computer aided dispatch and related software , but also acquired Automated fingerprint identification system software.

In October 2008, Motorola agreed to sell its Biometrics business to Safran, a French defense firm. Motorola's biometric business unit was headquartered in Anaheim, Calif. The deal closed in April 2009. The unit became part of Sagem Morpho, which was renamed MorphoTrak.

Split
On March 26, 2008, Motorola's board of directors approved a split into two different publicly traded companies. This came after talk of selling the company to another corporation. These new companies would comprise the business units of the current Motorola Mobile Devices and Motorola Broadband & Mobility Solutions. Originally it was expected that this action would be approved by regulatory bodies and complete by mid-2009, but the split was delayed due to company restructuring problems and the 2008–2009 extreme economic downturn.

On February 11, 2010, Motorola announced its separation into two independent, publicly traded companies, effective Q1 2011. The official split occurred at around 12:00 pm EST on January 4, 2011. The two new companies are called Motorola Mobility (now owned by Lenovo; cell phone and cable television equipment company) and Motorola Solutions (Government and Enterprise Business). Motorola Solutions is generally considered to be the direct successor to Motorola, Inc., as the reorganization was structured with Motorola Mobility being spun off. Motorola Solutions retains Motorola, Inc.'s pre-2011 stock price history, though it retired the old ticker symbol of "MOT" in favor of "MSI".

Motorola Mobility deal by Google
On August 15, 2011, seven months after Motorola Mobility was spun off into an independent company, Google announced that it would acquire Motorola Mobility for $12.5 billion, subject to approval from regulators in the United States and Europe.

According to the filing, Google senior vice president Andy Rubin first reached out to Motorola Mobility in early July 2011 to discuss the purchase by some of Google's competitors of the patent portfolio of Nortel Networks Corp., and to assess its potential impact on the Android ecosystem.

Google boosted its offer for Motorola Mobility by 33% in a single day in early August, even though Motorola wasn't soliciting competing bids. The aggressive bidding by Google showed that the search engine company was under considerable pressure to beef up its patent portfolio to protect its promising Android franchise from a growing number of legal challenges.

According to the filing, Google and Motorola began discussions about Motorola's patent portfolio in early July, as well as the "intellectual property litigation and the potential impact of such litigation on the Android ecosystem".

Motorola Mobility (Google) deal by Lenovo

Environmental record
Motorola, Inc., along with the Arizona Water Co. has been identified as the sources of trichloroethylene (TCE) contamination that took place in Scottsdale, Arizona. The malfunction led to a ban on the use of water that lasted three days and affected almost 5000 people in the area. Motorola was found to be the main source of the TCE, an industrial solvent that is thought to cause cancer. The TCE contamination was caused by a faulty blower on an air stripping tower that was used to take TCE from the water, and Motorola has attributed the situation to operator error.

Of eighteen leading electronics manufacturers in Greenpeace’s Guide to Greener Electronics (October 2010), Motorola shares sixth place with competitors Panasonic and Sony).

Motorola scores relatively well on the chemicals criteria and has a goal to eliminate PVC plastic and Brominated flame retardants (BFRs), though only in mobile devices and not in all its products introduced after 2010, despite the fact that Sony Ericsson and Nokia are already there. All of its mobile phones are now PVC-free and it has two PVC and BFR-free mobile phones, the A45 ECO and the GRASP; all chargers are also free from PVC and BFRs.

The company is also increasing the proportion of recycled materials that used in its products. For example, the housings for the MOTO W233 Renew and MOTOCUBO A45 Eco mobile phones contain plastic from post-consumer recycled water cooler bottles. According to the company's information, all of Motorola's newly designed chargers meet the current Energy Star requirements and exceed the requirements for standby/no-load modes by at least 67%.

See also

 List of Motorola products
 List of companies of the United States
 List of electronics companies

References

Further reading

External links

 "For Google, the Motorola Deal Was All About the Patents at First", by Spencer E. Ante, The Wall Street Journal, September 14, 2011.

 
1928 establishments in Illinois
2011 disestablishments in Illinois
American companies established in 1928
Companies based in Cook County, Illinois
Companies formerly listed on the Tokyo Stock Exchange
Computer companies disestablished in 2011
Computer companies established in 1928
Defunct companies based in Illinois
Defunct manufacturing companies of the United States
Defunct mobile phone manufacturers
Electronics companies disestablished in 2011
Electronics companies established in 1928
Electronics companies of the United States
Manufacturing companies disestablished in 2011
Manufacturing companies established in 1928
National Medal of Technology recipients
Schaumburg, Illinois
SysML Partners
Technology companies disestablished in 2011
Technology companies established in 1928
Telecommunications companies of the United States
Radio manufacturers
Defunct computer companies of the United States